Defiance of a Teenager (Hangul: 10대의 반항; Hanja: 10代의 反抗) is a 1959 South Korean film directed by Kim Ki-young. It comes after First Snow and before Sad Pastorale in Kim's trilogy of films about human survival during wartime.

Plot
A melodrama about a group of delinquent teenagers under the leadership of a corrupt boss.

Cast
Hwang Hae-nam
Um Aing-ran
Jo Mi-ryeong
Ahn Sung-ki
Hwang Jeong-sun

Awards

Buil Film Award

References

External links

1950s Korean-language films
South Korean drama films
Films directed by Kim Ki-young
Films about juvenile delinquency